Academic Emergency Medicine is a monthly peer reviewed medical journal published by Wiley on behalf of the Society for Academic Emergency Medicine. The editor in chief is Jeffrey A. Kline, MD. Coverage includes basic science, clinical research, education information, and clinical practice related to emergency medicine.

Abstracting and indexing 
This journal is indexed by the following services:

 Current Contents/ Clinical Medicine
 Journal Citation Reports/Science Edition 
  Research Alert (Thomson Reuters) 
 Science Citation Index
 Abstracts in Anthropology
 Embase 
 MEDLINE/Index Medicus

According to the Journal Citation Reports, the journal has a 2020 impact factor of 3.451.

External links

References 

Emergency medicine education
Emergency medicine journals
Wiley-Blackwell academic journals
Monthly journals
Publications established in 1994
English-language journals